The iCity (formerly known as City One) is a complex of two skyscrapers being built by MR Group in Moscow, Russia. The two skyscrapers are named Time Tower (34 floors; 150 m high) and Space Tower (61 floors; 256 m high). The construction will start in July 2020 and end in late 2024. The estimated cost of the project is 23 billion rubles (approx. $335 mln). In 2019 the media reported that one of the Russia's largest internet companies, Mail.Ru Group, had plans to lease a third of the floor space in this complex upon completion. Upon completion the iCity will be one of the tallest buildings in Moscow and in Europe.

Overview 
The complex was designed by a German-American architect Helmut Jahn and his firm Jahn Architecture. The atrium of iCity is designed by a German architect Werner Sobek. A five-storey parking garage will have almost 950 spaces. The brokers are Knight Frank, CBRE, Colliers International.

Gallery

External links 
 Official website
 Official webcam
 iCity в сообществе «Небоскрёбы России»
 iCity на карте небоскрёбов России

References 

Skyscrapers in Russia
Buildings and structures under construction in Russia
Buildings and structures in Moscow